Balasore District also known as Baleswar District or Baleshwar District, is an administrative district of Odisha state, in eastern India.  Balasore is one of the coastal districts of Odisha and lies on the northernmost part of the state.

Etymology 
Baleshwar is said to have got its name through the regional derivation of the word Baneswar, from Lord Baneshwar (Lord Shiva), the presiding deity of the town. The Siva temple, Baneswara Temple is located in Puruna Baleswar(old Baleswar).

Geography 

Balasore district is located in the northeast of the state of Odisha and lies between 21° 3' to 21° 59' north latitude and 86° 20' to 87° 29' east longitude. The average altitude of the district is 19.08-metre. The district has a total area of 3634 km2. It is bounded by Purba Medinipur, Paschim Medinipur and Jhargram districts of West Bengal in its north, the Bay of Bengal to its east, Bhadrak district to the south and Mayurbhanj and Keonjhar districts to the west.

The district lies along the Odisha coastal plain. In the southwest there are some small hill ranges. The Subarnarekha is the main river, and it empties into the Bay of Bengal in the district.

Transport 
Balasore railway station falls en route on the main line connecting Chennai to Kolkata. NH 16 (erstwhile NH 5) runs through Balasore, and NH 60, which connects Balasore to Kolkata, is a four lane express way.

The nearest airport from Balasore is Kolkata International Airport and Biju Patnaik International Airport, Bhubaneswar.

Balasore runs state Buses of (OSRTC) which provide point to point service from Kolkata to Bhubaneswar (via Balasore).

Demographics 

According to the 2011 census Balasore district has a population of 2,320,529, roughly equal to the nation of Latvia or the US state of New Mexico. This gives it a ranking of 195th in India (out of a total of 640). Its population growth rate over the decade 2001–2011 was 14.47%. Balasore has a sex ratio of 957 females for every 1000 males, and a literacy rate of 80.66%. Scheduled Castes and Scheduled Tribes make up 20.62% and 11.88% of the population respectively.

Languages 

At the time of the 2011 Census of India, 88.30% of the population in the district spoke Odia, 4.11% Santali, 3.39% Urdu, 1.30% Bengali and 0.67% Hindi as their first language.

The local dialect of the region is Baleswari bhasa, a dialect of Odia. Other languages include Bhunjia, spoken by approximately 7000 Bhunjia Adivasis and Santali.

Education
The district constitute primary university is F. M. University.
Jawahar Navodaya Vidyalaya, Bagudi  (also known as JNV Bagudi or JNV Balasore) is a public residential school in Bagudi village (near Mangalpur) of Soro block in the Balasore district. Government-run, it provides education to children predominantly from the rural areas and economically challenged families. It was established and is managed by Navodaya Vidyalaya Samiti (an autonomous organization of the Ministry of Human Resource Development and Department of Secondary Education and Higher Education).In accordance with the National Policy on Education (1986) of the government of India, the Jawahar Navodaya Vidyalaya Bagudi in the Balasore district was established during March 1987.

Politics
The district has 1 Lok Sabha constituency (Balasore) and 8 Vidhan Sabha constituencies. The current MP from Balasore is Pratap Chandra Sarangi from the BJP.

The following is the 8 Vidhan sabha constituencies of Balasore district and the elected members of that area:

See also 

 Baba Bhusandeswar Temple
 Rocket launch sites
 Indian Space Research Organisation
 Proof and Experimental Establishment, Chandipur
 Abdul Kalam Island
Bhadrak district

References

External links 

 Official website of Balasore District

 Balasore at Encyclopedia Astronautica

 
Danish India
Former Danish colonies
1828 establishments in India
Districts of Odisha